Emilio Kehrer (born 20 March 2002) is a German professional footballer who plays as a right winger for Cercle Brugge.

International career
Kehrer has represented Germany at youth international level.

Career statistics

Club

References

2002 births
Living people
German footballers
Association football forwards
Germany youth international footballers
3. Liga players
Regionalliga players
FV Ravensburg players
SC Freiburg players
SC Freiburg II players
Cercle Brugge K.S.V. players
German expatriate footballers
German expatriate sportspeople in Belgium
Expatriate footballers in Belgium